Dorf Mecklenburg is a municipality in the Nordwestmecklenburg district, in Mecklenburg-Vorpommern, Germany. It is located 6 km south of Wismar. It is home to the castle "Mikilenburg" (Old German: "big castle"), that gave its name to the whole region known as Mecklenburg.

Geography
The village of Dorf Mecklenburg lies between the Hanseatic city of Wismar and Lake Schwerin, one of Germany's largest lakes. The North Sea-Baltic Sea watershed is only about ten kilometres away from the Baltic Sea (Wismar Bay) in the slightly hilly area. To the west, the Wallensteingraben, which connects Lake Schwerin to the Baltic Sea as the only outflow, runs past the village and was built between 1577 and 1582 under Duke Ulrich.

Districts
The following districts belong to the village of Dorf Mecklenburg:

Transport accessibility
Dorf Mecklenburg, only 6 km away from Wismar, is very well connected to national transport networks. The A 20 Baltic motorway (Lübeck - Stettin) and the northern section of the A 14 (Wismar - Schwerin) pass in the immediate vicinity. The village can be reached from Schwerin and Wismar via the B 106. The local railway station is on the Ludwigslust–Wismar railway line.

References

Nordwestmecklenburg